Calypso Mama, real name Maureen Verlene Duvalier, (14 May 1926 - 19 December 2014)  was a legendary Bahamian blues/calypso artist.

Early life
Calypso Mama was born to Bahamian parents. Her grandfather on her father's side is from Haiti and is related to former dictator, François Duvalier.

Famous Songs
 Yes, Yes, Yes (2:53)

References

Calypsonians
1926 births
2014 deaths
Bahamian singers
Bahamian people of Haitian descent